Raga County is a county in the Western Bahr el Ghazal, South Sudan. It is the largest county in the nation. In Arabic, Raga County can be known as "Raja".

Population
Raga County's population is 54,340. It is the least populous county in Western Bahr el Ghazal.

Towns and cities
Raga
Sopo

References

Counties of South Sudan
Western Bahr el Ghazal